Potatoes O'Brien is a dish of pan-fried potatoes along with red and green bell peppers and onion. The potatoes and the bell peppers are fried (varying according to taste) and are served hot.  The origin of the dish is disputed. The dish has been claimed to originate in the early 1900s from a Boston restaurant known as Jerome's and from a Manhattan restaurant known as Jack's during the same time period.

Variations
A variation of potatoes O'Brien includes bacon in the dish.

Potatoes O'Brien can be seasoned many different ways, typically with black pepper, paprika, salt and garlic powder.

See also

Hash browns, the shredded potato dish
Home fries, the simple chunked potato preparation
Lyonnaise potatoes, pan-fried potatoes from French cuisine
Pyttipanna, chopped potatoes mixed with meat and onions from the Nordic countries
 List of brunch foods
 List of potato dishes

References

Potato dishes
American vegetable dishes